Cyclocosmia truncata is a species of cork-lid trapdoor spider in the family Halonoproctidae. It is found in the United States.

References

External links

 

Halonoproctidae
Articles created by Qbugbot
Spiders described in 1841